Miguel Ángel Raimondo (born 12 December 1943) is an Argentine football midfielder. He won ten trophies in his career, eight with Club Atlético Independiente and a further two with River Plate, he was awarded the Olimpia de Plata as the 1974 Argentine sports journalist's footballer of the year.

Raimondo played his first professional game for Rosario Central in the Primera Division Argentina in 1965. One year later he was transferred to  Atlanta where he played until the end of the 1968 season.

In 1969, he joined Club Atlético Independiente, it was with Independiente that he had most of his success as a player, while he was there the club won two league championships, three (of their four in a row) Copa Libertadores titles, two Copa Interamericanas and an Intercontinental Cup.

Raimondo was selected as the Player of the Year of Argentina in 1974.

In 1975 Raimondo joined River Plate, he was only with the club for one season but in that time he helped the club to win both of the Argentine league titles that year.

In 1976 Raimondo joined All Boys, the club finished bottom of their group in both the Nacional and the Metropolitano championships, prompting Raimondo's retirement from football at the end of the season.

Honours
 Independiente 
Primera Division Argentina: Metropolitano 1970, Metropolitano 1971
Copa Libertadores: 1972, 1973, 1974
Copa Interamericana: 1973, 1974
Intercontinental Cup: 1973

 River Plate
Primera Division Argentina: Metropolitano 1975, Nacional 1975

References

1943 births
Living people
Argentine footballers
Argentina international footballers
Association football midfielders
Argentine Primera División players
Rosario Central footballers
Club Atlético Atlanta footballers
Club Atlético Independiente footballers
Club Atlético River Plate footballers
All Boys footballers
Footballers from Rosario, Santa Fe